Your Saving Grace is the fourth album by American rock group the Steve Miller Band, released in November 1969. It reached number 38 on the Billboard Top LPs chart.

Track listing

References

External links

Steve Miller Band albums
1969 albums
Albums produced by Glyn Johns
Capitol Records albums
Albums recorded at Wally Heider Studios